Utrecht Science Park (also known as De Uithof) is a science park and neighbourhood in Utrecht, Netherlands. It is located to the east of the city. It is the largest campus of Utrecht University. Apart from the faculties of Law, Humanities and University College Utrecht, most of the university buildings are located in Utrecht Science Park. It is also a main location of the HU University of Applied Sciences Utrecht and the University Medical Center Utrecht, and houses the main university library, student housing and botanical gardens.

History

The Dutch government purchased a plot of land of approximately 300 hectares for Utrecht University in 1958. The area was named "De Uithof", after a local farm. The first building, currently known as the Marinus Ruppert Building, opened in 1961. 

The city council decided to officially rename De Uithof to "Utrecht Science Park" in 2018.

Transportation
On 14 December 2019, the Uithoflijn line 22 of the Utrecht sneltram (light rail) system opened, connecting Utrecht Centraal railway station to De Uithof. It replaced bus line 12 which used bi-articulated buses. The Uithoflijn has 5 tram stops in De Uithof: Padualaan, Heidelberglaan, UMC, WKZ / Máxima and the tram terminal P+R Science Park.

The tram stop P+R Science Park has a large park-and-ride facility, designed by KCAP, construction of which began in August 2011.

Buildings in De Uithof

Some of the buildings on De Uithof have an unusual architecture, and some have won prizes for their architecture. The Educatorium, designed by Rem Koolhaas (1997), contains a glass-bottomed walking bridge and circular walls. The Minnaertgebouw used to contain a large basin that was used to collect rain water, and its outer wall is supported by large characters, M, I, N, N, A, E, R, T. The Universiteitsbibliotheek (University Library), designed by Wiel Arets (2004), is known for its spacious interior and black exterior. Many of the buildings are named after scientists that worked in a field which is similar to the specialization of the occupants of the building.

University buildings
This is a partial list of buildings at the Utrecht Science Park. The official names of all of the buildings are found here. The Dutch word "gebouw" means "building".
 Aardwetenschappengebouw (Earth Sciences Building) - geoscience
 Bestuursgebouw – board, management and administration of Utrecht University
 Buys Ballotgebouw (BBG), named after meteorologist C. H. D. Buys Ballot - experimental physics
 Caroline Bleekergebouw, named after physicist and instrument maker Caroline Bleeker - workshop for scientific instruments
 David de Wiedgebouw, named after pharmacologist David de Wied - pharmacology
 Educatorium - lecture halls
 Hans Freudenthalgebouw, named after mathematician Hans Freudenthal - mathematics
 Hijmans van den Berghgebouw, named after physician Abraham Albert Hijmans van den Bergh – (bio)medical education
 Kruytgebouw (formerly known as Trans-3), named after chemist Hugo R. Kruyt - chemistry, business startups
 Leonard S. Ornsteinlaboratorium, named after physicist Leonard Ornstein - experimental physics
 Marinus Ruppertgebouw (formerly known as Trans-1), named after pedagogue Marinus Ruppert, who started the development of buildings on De Uithof - lecture and workshop halls, computer hall
 Martinus J. Langeveldgebouw (formerly known as Centrumgebouw Zuid), named after Martinus J. Langeveld, Faculty of Social Sciences founder - social science
 Minnaertgebouw, named after astronomer Marcel Minnaert - physics, geoscience, student services
 Nicolaas Bloembergengebouw, named after physicist Nicolaas Bloembergen – science, NMR spectroscopy
 Robert J. Van de Graafflaboratorium, named after physicist and instrument maker Robert J. Van de Graaff - particle accelerator for physics
 Sjoerd Groenmangebouw (formerly known as Centrumgebouw Noord), named after sociologist Sjoerd Groenman - social science, student services
 Stratenum, named after physician W. van Straaten – medical education
 Universiteitsbibliotheek Uithof - Main library
 Victor J. Koningsbergergebouw, named after biologist Victor Jacob Koningsberger - medicine, geoscience, other science
 Willem C. van Unnikgebouw (formerly known as Trans-2), named after bible scholar Willem C. van Unnik - social science

Student housing
 Cambridgelaan, built in 1998. 1002 occupants.
 De Bisschoppen (the Bishops,) built in 2006. 552 occupants.
 Casa Confetti, built in 2008. 377 occupants.
 Johanna, built in 2015. 655 occupants.

Convenient facilities 

 SPAR
 Primera
 Olympos
 Geldmaat ATM

References 

Utrecht University